Events from the year 1590 in Sweden The Russo-Swedish War of 1590–1595 was sparked by Russian King Boris Godunov's interest in taking over Duchy of Estonia that Sweden had occupied after the Livonian War. The Russo-Swedish War of 1590–1595 was instigated by Boris Godunov in the hope of gaining the territory of the Duchy of Estonia along the Gulf of Finland belonging to Sweden since the previous Livonian War.

As soon as the Truce of Plussa expired early in 1590, a large Russian army led by Godunov and his sickly brother-in-law, Fyodor I of Russia, marched from Moscow towards Novgorod. On 18 January they crossed the Narva River and laid siege to the Swedish castle of Narva, commanded by Arvid Stålarm. Another important fortress, Jama (Jamburg), fell to Russian forces within two weeks. Simultaneously, the Russians ravaged Estonia as far as Reval (Tallinn) and Finland as far as Helsingfors (Helsinki).

On 25 February, the local Swedish governor, Carl Henriksson Horn af Kanckas, was compelled to sign an armistice, which obliged Sweden to surrender the territories won by the Treaty of Plussa — namely Jama, Koporye, and Ivangorod. This peace settlement displeased John III of Sweden, who sent a fleet to take hold of Ivangorod, but this attempt to besiege the fortress was checked by a Russian castellan. Matters then remained quiet until summer 1591, when the Swedes struck against Gdov, capturing a local governor, Prince Vladimir Dolgorukov.

The other war theatre was Eastern Karelia, where the Swedes sacked Kola and other Russian settlements bordering the White Sea. A raiding party allegedly led by Finnish peasant chief Pekka Vesainen, destroyed the Pechenga Monastery on December 25, 1589, killing 50 monks and 65 lay brothers. He then turned his troops to Kola Fjord but could not manage to destroy the Kola Fortress due to lack of men. Instead he captured and burned Kandalaksha (Kantalahti) and a small Russian settlement in Kem. Again, due to lack of men, he could not capture the Solovetsky Monastery on the Solovetsky Islands.

Godunov's government gradually overcame those setbacks, as Prince Volkonsky was sent to pacify Karelia, and the noblest Russian generals Bogdan Belsky, Fyodor Mstislavsky, and Prince Trubetskoy devastated Finland. Then, the war settled into indecisive skirmishing from which it would not subsequently emerge. Three years elapsed before Sweden, in May 1595, agreed to sign the Treaty of Teusina (Tyavzino, Tyavzin, Täyssinä). It restored to Russia all territory ceded in the Truce of Plussa of 1583 to Sweden except for Narva. Russia had to renounce all claims on Estonia, including Narva, and Sweden's sovereignty over Estonia from 1561 was confirmed. John III (Swedish: Johan III, Finnish: Juhana III; 20 December 1537 – 17 November 1592) was King of Sweden from 1569 until his death. He was the son of King Gustav I of Sweden and his second wife Margaret Leijonhufvud. He was also, quite autonomously, the ruler of Finland, as Duke John from 1556 to 1563. In 1581 he assumed also the title Grand Prince of Finland. He attained the Swedish throne after a rebellion against his half-brother Eric XIV. He is mainly remembered for his attempts to close the gap between the newly established Lutheran Church of Sweden and the Catholic church, as well as his conflict with, and murder of, his brother.

His first wife was Catherine Jagellonica of the Polish-Lithuanian ruling family, and their son Sigismund eventually ascended both the Polish-Lithuanian and Swedish thrones. John was the second son of Gustav Vasa (1523–60). His mother was Margaret Leijonhufvud (1514–51), a Swedish noblewoman. Gustav had placed his son in Finland to secure Swedish territory in the eastern Baltic from a Russian threat. John was sent as an emissary to England to secure the hand of Queen Elizabeth I in marriage to his half-brother Crown Prince Erik (1559–60). This marriage would have secured Swedish access to Western Europe. That mission failed, but while in England John was able to observe the reintroduction of Protestantism and the Book of Common Prayer (1559). The Finnish duke had liturgical and theological interests.

As Duke of Finland, he opposed his half-brother King Eric XIV's 1560–68) efforts to secure Reval and East Baltic ports. John and his wife Katarina were imprisoned in the Gripsholm in 1563. After his release from prison, probably because of his brother's insanity (see Sture Murders), John again joined the opposition of the nobles, deposed Eric and made himself the king. His important ally was his maternal uncle Sten Leijonhufvud, who at deathbed was made Count of Raseborg. Shortly after this John executed his brother's most trusted counsellor, Jöran Persson, whom he held largely responsible for his harsh treatment while in prison.

John further initiated peace talks with Denmark-Norway and Lübeck to end the Scandinavian Seven Years' War, but rejected the resulting Treaties of Roskilde (1568) where his envoys had accepted far-reaching Danish demands. After two more years of fighting, this war was concluded without many Swedish concessions in the Treaty of Stettin (1570). During the following years he successfully fought Russia in the Livonian War, concluded by the Treaty of Plussa in 1583, a war that meant a Swedish reconquest of Narva. As a whole his foreign policy was affected by his connection to Poland of which country his son Sigismund III Vasa was made king in 1587.

In domestic politics John showed clear Catholic sympathies, inspired by his Polish wife, a fact that created frictions to the Swedish clergy and nobility. He sought to enlist the help of the papacy in gaining release of his wife's family assets, which were frozen in Naples. He also allowed Jesuits to secretly staff the Royal Theological College in Stockholm. However, John himself was a learned follower of the mediating theologian George Cassander. He sought reconciliation between Rome and Wittenberg on the basis of the consensus of the first five centuries of Christianity (consensus quinque saecularis). John approved the publication of the Lutheran Swedish Church Order of Archbishop Laurentius Petri in 1571 but also got the church to approve an addendum to the church order in 1575, Nova ordinantia ecclesiastica that displayed a return to patristic sources. This set the stage for his promulgation of the Swedish-Latin Red Book, entitled Liturgia suecanae ecclesiae catholicae & orthodoxae conformis, which reintroduced several Catholic customs and resulted in the Liturgical Struggle, which was not to end for twenty years. In 1575, he gave his permission for the remaining Catholic convents in Sweden to start receiving novices again. From time to time he was also at odds theologically with his younger brother Duke Charles of Sudermannia (afterwards Charles IX of Sweden), who had Calvinist sympathies, and did not promote King John's Liturgy in his duchy. John III was an eager patron of art and architecture. He turned the medieval Kalmar Castle into a Renaissance palace and often resided there because it was closer to Poland. In January 1569, John was recognized as king by the same riksdag that forced Eric XIV off the throne. But this recognition was not without influence from John; Duke Karl received confirmation on his dukedom without the restrictions on his power that the Arboga articles imposed. The nobilities' power and rights were extended and their responsibilities lessened.

John was still concerned about his position as king as long as Eric was alive. During the imprisonment of Eric, three major conspiracies were made to depose John: the 1569 Plot, the Mornay Plot, and the 1576 Plot. The fear of a possible liberation of the imprisoned king worried him to the point that in 1571 he ordered the guards to murder the captured king if there were any suspicion of an attempt to liberate him. It is possible that this is how Eric died in 1577.

John III claimed that he had liberated Sweden from the "tyrant" Eric XIV, just as his father had liberated Sweden from the "bloodhound" Christian II. John was violent, hot-tempered, and greatly suspicious. Per Brahe the Elder (1520–1590) was a Swedish statesman.

Brahe was the son of Joakim Brahe (died 1520 in the Stockholm Bloodbath) and Margareta Eriksdotter Vasa, the sister of Gustav Eriksson Vasa, who became King of Sweden in 1523. Brahe was thus the cousin of three future kings, Eric XIV, John III and Charles IX, all of them sons of Gustav Vasa.

Brahe was among the first members of the Swedish nobility to be created a count when titles of nobility were introduced by King Eric XIV on the occasion of his coronation in 1561. Brahe was given the county of Visingsborg, situated on Visingsö, the next year. He had been member of the Privy Council of Sweden and Governor of Stockholm Castle from 1540. At the accession of King John III, he was appointed the Lord High Justiciar of Sweden (riksdrots) and Governor of Norrland as well as Governor of Stockholm Castle again.

He married Beata Stenbock (1533–1583), daughter of Gustaf Olofsson Stenbock and Brita Eriksdotter Leijonhufvud, and elder sister of Gustav Vasa's third wife, Katarina Stenbock. Brahe's mother-in-law was the daughter of Erik Abrahamsson Leijonhufvud and Ebba Eriksdotter Vasa, the mother of Gustav Vasa's second wife, Margaret Eriksdotter Leijonhufvud. (Ebba Eriksdotter Vasa was herself a second cousin of Gustav Vasa.)John married his first wife, Catherine Jagellonica of Poland (1526–83), of the House of Jagiello, in Vilnius on 4 October 1562. In Sweden, she is known as Katarina Jagellonica. She was the sister of king Sigismund II Augustus of Poland. Their children were:

 Isabella (1564–1566)
 Sigismund (1566–1632), King of Poland (1587–1632), King of Sweden (1592–99), and Grand Duke of Finland and Lithuania
 Anna (1568–1625)

He married his second wife, Gunilla Bielke (1568–1592), on 21 February 1585; they had a son:

Tomb of John III in Uppsala Cathedral.
 John (1589–1618), firstly Duke of Finland, then from 1608 Duke of Ostrogothia. The young duke married his first cousin Maria Elisabet (1596–1618), daughter of Charles IX of Sweden (reigned 1599–1611)

With his mistress Karin Hansdotter (1532–1596) he had at least four illegitimate children:

 Sofia Gyllenhielm (1556–1583), who married Pontus De la Gardie
 Augustus Gyllenhielm (1557–1560)
 Julius Gyllenhielm (1559–1581)
 Lucretia Gyllenhielm (1560–1585)

John cared for Karin and their children even after he married Catherine Jagellonica, in 1562. He got Karin a husband who would care for her and the children: in 1561, she married nobleman Klas Andersson (Västgöte), a friend and servant of John. They had a daughter named Brita. He continued supporting Karin and his illegitimate children as king, from 1568. In 1572 Karin married again, as her first husband was executed for treason by Eric XIV in 1563, to a Lars Henrikson, whom John ennobled in 1576 to care for his issue with Karin. The same year, he made his daughter Sofia a lady in the castle, as a servant to his sister Princess Elizabeth of Sweden. In 1580, John married her to Pontus de la Gardie. She later died giving birth to Jacob De la Gardie.

Brahe was the father of Erik Brahe (1552–1614), Gustaf Brahe (1558–1615), Margareta Brahe (1559–1638), Magnus Brahe (1564–1633), Sigrid Brahe and Abraham Brahe (1569–1630), and the grandfather of Per Brahe the Younger (1602–1680), Ebba Brahe and Margareta Brahe. Clas Åkesson Tott (c. 1530–1596) was a military Field Marshal (1572) and member of the Privy Council of Sweden (1575).

In the Russo-Swedish War (1554–1557), he was the rittmeister of the cavalry squadron Upplandsgatan. He became responsible for the enlistment of army personnel in Finland, in 1563. At the Battle of Axtorna, in 1566, he was taken as prisoner of war, but he was released in 1569. As the commander-in-chief of Estonia (1572–1574), he defeated the Russians at the Battle of Lode in 1573, before he was displaced by Pontus de la Gardie due to the disastrous outcome of the Siege of Wesenberg (1574).

He became the stadtholder of Finland in 1576, but he fell out of grace with John III which led to his losing his titles in 1589 and his membership in the Privy Council. Anna Klemetsdotter Hogenskild (1513-1590), also known as fru Anna till Åkerö ('lady Anna of Åkerö') and fru Anna till Hedensö ('lady Anna of Hedensö'), was a Swedish court official and landowner. She served as hovmästarinna to queen Catherine Stenbock of Sweden, and then to the daughter and sisters of Eric XIV of Sweden. Anna Hogenskild was the daughter of the nobleman Klemet Bengtsson Hogenskild of Åkerö (d. 1512) and lady Anna Hansdotter Thott of Bjurum (d. 1549). She belonged to a prominent noble family: her mother was the maternal granddaughter of princess Christina (ca 1432- before 1500), eldest daughter of Charles VIII of Sweden, and related to Sten Sture the Elder.

She married nobleman Jacob Krumme (d. 1531) in 1530, and nobleman Nils Pedersson Bielke (d. 1550) in 1537. In her second married she became the mother of three sons and a daughter: riksråd baron Hogenskild Bielke (1538-1605), Carin Nilsdotter Bielke (1539-1596), riksråd baron Claes Nilsson Bielke (1544-1623) of Vik, and riksråd Ture Nilsson Bielke (1548-1600). She had good connections at court, where her family was in service. Her second spouse was a court official and a trusted confidant of king Gustav I of Sweden, her eldest son Hogenskild Bielke became the playmate of prince Magnus, Duke of Östergötland and later (1556) courtier of king Gustav; and her second son Claes married Elsa Fleming, the sister of queen Gunilla Bielke. Anna Hogenskild herself was eventually appointed hovmästarinna (Chief lady-in-waiting or Mistress of the Robes) to king Gustav's last queen, Catherine Stenbock. As such, she was made responsible for all the ladies-in-waiting in the household of the queen.

Anna Hogenskild had been highly regarded by King Eric XIV already when he was a crown prince, and during his reign, he displayed his favor upon her and her children. After he succeeded to the throne in 1560, he had no queen, but he gave her the office of hovmästarinna in the household of the princesses, his sisters: Princess Cecilia, Anna, Sophia and Elizabeth of Sweden. She was also given the responsibility for the household of his illegitimate daughters Virginia Eriksdotter and Constantia Eriksdotter. As Mistress of the Household of the Princesses, she was known to have used her position to benefit her family: in 1563, eight of the thirteen maids-of-honour to the princesses where related to her. She was, however, apparently both well liked and respected at court, and was not known to be too strict: in fact, king Eric appointed her brother-in-law Ture Pedersson as chamberlain in the household of the princesses because he did not trust Anna Hogenskild to be able to keep his sisters sufficiently under control.

Anna left court service after the deposition of Eric XIV in 1568. King John III of Sweden suggested that the deposed king Eric was to be imprisoned in Vik Castle, one of the estates of Anna, but the negotiations did not succeed and the plan was not put to fruition.

Incumbents
 Monarch – John III

Events

 - A new succession order, the 1590 års arvförening, is issued.

Births

Deaths
 Per Brahe the Elder, statesman  (born 1520) 
 Clas Åkesson Tott, field marshal and privy Councillor  (born  1530) 
 Anna Hogenskild, court official (born 1513)

References

 
Years of the 16th century in Sweden
Sweden